The 2005 Tour de Hongrie was the 32nd edition of the Tour de Hongrie cycle race and was held from 2 to 7 August 2005. The race started in Veszprém and finished in Budapest. The race was won by Tamás Lengyel.

General classification

References

2005
Tour de Hongrie
Tour de Hongrie